George Ramsay Cook  (28 November 1931 – 14 July 2016) was a Canadian historian and general editor of the Dictionary of Canadian Biography. He was professor of history at the University of Toronto, 1958–1968; York University, 1969–1996; Visiting Professor of Canadian Studies, Harvard University, 1968–69; Visiting Professor, and Yale University, 1978–79 and 1997. Through his championing of so-called "limited identities", Cook contributed to the rise of the New Social History, which uses "class, gender and ethnicity" as its three main categories of analysis. Cook's conception of "limited identities" was famously formulated in an article in the International Journal in 1967, Canada's centenary year, reviewing the state of contemporary scholarship on Canadian nationalism:

During his teaching career, Cook supervised the work of 39 PhD students and many prominent social historians such as Franca Iacovetta.

In 1997, the Ramsay Cook Research Scholarship was established at York University to honour his contribution to the field of history.

He publicly supported Pierre Elliott Trudeau in his successful attempt to gain the leadership of the Liberal Party of Canada in 1968.

He was married to Eleanor Cook, an English professor at the University of Toronto.

Honours
Cook received the Governor General's Award for non-fiction in 1985 for The Regenerators: Social Criticism in Late Victorian English Canada. He is a Fellow of the Royal Society of Canada and was made an Officer of the Order of Canada in 1986. He was awarded the Order of the Sacred Treasure by the Japanese government in 1994. In 2005, Cook received the Molson Prize in Social Sciences and Humanities.

Selected works
The Politics of John W. Dafoe and the Free Press, 1963.
Canada and the French Canadian Question, 1966.
The Maple Leaf Forever: Essays on Nationalism and Politics in Canada, 1971.
Canada 1896–1921: A Nation Transformed, with Robert Craig Brown, 1975. (Part of The Canadian Centenary Series.)
The Regenerators: Social Criticism in Late Victorian English Canada, 1985.
Canada, Quebec and the Uses of Nationalism, 1986.
The Teeth of Time, Remembering Pierre Elliot Trudeau, 2006.

References

Further reading
 Table ronde Ramsay Cook, special number of "Études canadiennes – Canadian Studies. Revue interdisciplinaire des études canadiennes en France" december 2018  (online version) Extracts  pp 147 – 175 (engl. and french)

External links
 Historian Ramsay Cook helped define modern Canada Globe and Mail obituary by John Ibbitson, 2016 July 22 (accessed 2 October 2016)
 George Ramsay Cook entry at The Canadian Encyclopedia online

1931 births
2016 deaths
20th-century Canadian historians
21st-century Canadian historians
Canadian male non-fiction writers
Fellows of the Royal Society of Canada
Governor General's Award-winning non-fiction writers
Historians of Canada
Officers of the Order of Canada
Queen's University at Kingston alumni
Social historians
University of Toronto alumni
Academic staff of the University of Toronto
Writers from Saskatchewan
Writers from Toronto
Academic staff of York University
Presidents of the Canadian Historical Association